Libuše Jarcovjáková (born 5 May 1952) is a Czech photographer and educator, based in Prague. Jarcovjáková photographed nightlife, minority groups and marginalised people in the 1970s and 1980s in Prague and West Berlin, and made self portraits. She made diaristic work of her hedonistic lifestyle, and of the inhabitants of a clandestine gay bar that she visited almost nightly, in 1980s Prague, where the Communist state was institutionally homophobic.

Life and work
Jarcovjáková was born in Prague in what was then the Czechoslovak Socialist Republic. Her parents were painters. She studied for an MA at the Film and TV School of the Academy of Performing Arts in Prague. At the end of the 1970s she undertook a creative residency in Japan for several months. In 1985 Jarcovjáková moved to West Berlin and in 1992 returned to Prague. She has been teaching photography since the 1990s, currently doing so at the College of Graphic Design and the Secondary School of Graphic Design (VOŠ a SPŠ Grafická v Praze) in Prague.

Jarcovjáková's written diaries and photographs from Prague, West Berlin and Tokyo between 1971 and 1987, were published in the 2016 book Černé Roky (The Black Years).

Between 1983 and 1985, Jarcovjáková photographed the inhabitants of a clandestine gay bar in Prague, called T-Club, which she frequented almost every night, using black and white film and a flash. Her other subjects at this time were herself and Vietnamese and Cuban economic migrants. Though sex between people of the same gender was decriminalised in Czechoslovakia in 1962, people continued to be imprisoned for being openly gay. Because the work depicted her own sexual deviance as well as that of people at T-Club, it was not shown until 2008 and was published in 2019 as Evokativ. Sean O'Hagan, writing in The Guardian, described the work as having an "edgy diaristic approach, laying bare a life lived recklessly amid a period of political repression" [. . .] "images that pay little attention to formal concerns, but nevertheless capture a time and milieu in an uncompromising way."

Publications

Publications by Jarcovjáková
Černé Roky: 1971–1987 = The Black Years: 1971–1987. Prague: Nakladatelství Wo-men, 2016. . Photographs, letters and journal entries. In English and Czech. Includes booklet titled The Black Years / English trial version, in English.
Evokativ. Prague: Untitled, 2019. . With texts by Jarcovjáková and Lucie Černá. Edition of 1000 copies.

Publications paired with others
Ženy 60+. Prague: Nakladatelství Wo-men, 2018. Text by Pavla Frýdlová and photographs by Jarcovjáková. .

Exhibitions
Anamnesis / Remembering, Galerie 1. Patro (Gallery 1st Floor), Prague, 2012
T-Club, Langhans café, Prague, 2019
Evokativ, Rencontres d'Arles, Arles, France, 2019

Awards
The Photographer of the Year, Association of Professional Photographers of the Czech Republic

References

External links

20th-century diarists
Photographers from Prague
Academy of Performing Arts in Prague alumni
1952 births
Living people
LGBT photographers
Czech LGBT artists
Czechoslovak LGBT people